Phajoding Monastery is a Buddhist monastery near Thimpu in Bhutan. It was one of the richest and most decorated monasteries in the country however due to neglect, it was listed in 2010  by the World Monuments Fund as an endangered cultural monument.

Phajoding Monastery was founded in the 13th  century by Phajo Drugom Zhigpo (1184-1251), a Tibetan lama who spread the Drukpa Kagyu teachings of Buddhism in Bhutan. Most of the buildings at Phajoding however were constructed in 1748 by Gyelwa Shakya Rinchen (1710-1759), the 9th Je Khenpo (rje mkhan po). Today, the monastery currently houses 80 young monks.

References 

Drukpa Kagyu monasteries and temples in Bhutan
Tibetan Buddhist monasteries
Tibetan Buddhism in Bhutan